The 1986–87 Scottish Inter-District Championship was a rugby union competition for Scotland's district teams.

This season saw the 34th formal Scottish Inter-District Championship.

Edinburgh District won the competition with four wins.

Midlands fixtures for the season. Midlands - Edinburgh South - Ulster

1986-87 League Table

Results

Round 1

Edinburgh District: Gavin Hastings (Watsonians), S. W. McAslan (Heriots), Euan Kennedy (Watsonians), S. H. Scott (Stewarts Melville), M. M. Fisken (Boroughmuir), J. F. Paton (Edinburgh Academicals), M. D. Hall (Boroughmuir), Alex Brewster (Stewarts Melville) [captain], Kenny Milne (Heriots), Iain Milne (Heriots), J. S. Hamilton (Heriots), Jeremy Richardson (Edinburgh Academicals), Jim Calder (Stewarts Melville), Finlay Calder (Stewarts Melville), K. P. Rafferty (Heriots)

Glasgow District: D. H. Drummond (West of Scotland), S. Munro (Ayr), D. R. McKee (Jordanhill), Calum MacGregor (Boroughmuir), P. P. Manning (Ayr), D. R. Barrett (West of Scotland), E. D. McCorkindale (Glasgow High Kelvinside), Gerry McGuinness (West of Scotland), Graham Ellis (Glasgow Academicals), Brian Robertson (Stirling County), H. M. Parker (Kilmarnock), A. F. McDowall (Ayr), W. H. Malcolm (Glasgow Academicals), J. R. Beattie (Glasgow Academicals) [captain], J. D. Busby (Hillhead). Replacement: D. R. Livingston (West of Scotland) for Beattie.

Round 2

Anglo-Scots: S. R. Irvine (London Scottish), J. C. W. Beazley (Edinburgh Wanderers), R. McLean (Gloucester), D. R. M. Bruce Lockhart (London Scottish), T. Paterson-Brown (London Scottish), C. Russell (Wasps), G. J. M. Irvine (Harrogate), P. Jones (Gloucester), I. Kirk (London Scottish), D. Butcher (Sale), Jeremy Campbell-Lamerton (London Scottish) [captain], Chris Gray (Nottingham), S. Smith (Gosforth), A. J. Macklin (London Scottish), Iain Morrison (London Scottish). Replacement: R. Cunningham (Wasps) for Macklin (44 minutes)

North and Midlands: C. J. Macartney (Boroughmuir), R. Harris (Howe of Fife), B. Edwards (Boroughmuir), D. K. Graham (Highland), M. Cross (Dunfermline), N. J. Marshall (Heriots), N. Sharp (Dunfermline), P. Flockhart (Highland), D. Wylie (Boroughmuir), J. L. Scobbie (Glasgow Academicals), C. A. Galbraith (Boroughmuir), I. T. Rankin (Howe of Fife), J. G. Bryce (Heriots), D. Leckie (Edinburgh Academicals), H. J. Edwards (Boroughmuir) [captain]

Glasgow District: R. Kemp (Kilmarnock), S. Munro (Ayr), D. R. McKee (Jordanhill), A. G. Ker (Glasgow Academicals), P. P. Manning (Ayr), Calum MacGregor (Boroughmuir), A. G. J. Nicolson (Ayr), G. M. McGuinness (West of Scotland), D. R. Livingston (West of Scotland), Brian Robertson (Stirling County), J. Riozzi (West of Scotland), A. F. McDowall (Ayr), W. H. Malcolm (Glasgow Academicals) [captain], J. D. Busby (Hillhead), K. Young (Kilmarnock). Replacement: R. T. S. Bedford (Jordanhill) for Malcolm (74 minutes)

South: Peter Dods (Gala), Alan Tait (Kelso), Keith Murray (Hawick), Roger Baird (Kelso), Iwan Tukalo (Selkirk), John Rutherford (Selkirk), Roy Laidlaw (Jedforest), T. G. Waite (Kelso), Colin Deans (Hawick) [captain], R. A. Nichol (Hawick), Alister Campbell (Hawick), Iain Paxton (Selkirk), R. E. Paxton (Kelso), John Jeffrey (Kelso), Derek Turnbull (Hawick)

Round 3

North and Midlands: G. Spowart (Dundee HSFP), C. J. Macartney (Boroughmuir), B. Edwards (Boroughmuir), P. F. Rouse (Dundee HSFP), M. Cross (Dunfermline), N. J. Marshall (Heriots), K. Troup (Gordonians), P. Flockhart (Highland), D. Wylie (Boroughmuir), A. Wemyss (Highland), B. H. Bell (Highland) [captain], I. T. Rankin (Howe of Fife), H. J. Edwards (Boroughmuir), D. Leckie (Edinburgh Academicals), D. McIvor (Dunfermline)

South: Peter Dods (Gala), Roger Baird (Kelso), Keith Murray (Hawick), Keith Robertson (Melrose), Iwan Tukalo (Selkirk), John Rutherford (Selkirk), Roy Laidlaw (Jedforest), K. S. Sudlow (Jedforest), Colin Deans (Hawick) [captain], R. A. Nichol (Hawick), Alister Campbell (Hawick), A. J. Tomes (Hawick),  R. E. Paxton (Kelso), Iain Paxton (Selkirk), John Jeffrey (Kelso)

Round 4

North and Midlands: H. M. Murray (Dunfermline), M. Cross (Dunfermline), R. D. K. Graham (Highland), B. Edwards (Boroughmuir), C. J. Macartney (Boroughmuir), N. J. Marshall (Heriots), K. Troup (Gordonians), P. Flockhart (Highland),

Edinburgh District: 

South: 

Anglo-Scots:

Round 5

Edinburgh District: 

Anglo-Scots: 

Glasgow District: 

North and Midlands:

Round 6

Anglo-Scots: 

Glasgow District: 

South: 

Edinburgh District:

Matches outwith the Championship

Other Scottish matches

Glasgow trial: 

-: 

Midland Blues Trial: 

Midland Whites Trial: 

Midlands District: 

Edinburgh District: 

Midlands District: 

Glasgow District: 

Ayrshire: 

Dumfries and Galloway: 

Renfrewshire: 

Lanarkshire: 

Renfrewshire: 

Dunbartonshire: 

Ayrshire: 

Lanarkshire:

Junior matches

Glasgow: 

South: 

South of Scotland: 

Midlands District:

Trial matches

Blues: A. G. Hastings (Watsonians), M. D. F. Duncan (West of Scotland), D. S. Wylie (Stewart's Melville), S. Hastings (Watsonians), I. Tulako (Selkirk), J. Rutherford (Selkirk), R. J. Laidlaw (Jedforest), D. M. B. Sole (Bath), C. T. Deans (Hawick) [captain], I. G. Milne (Heriots), A. J. Campbell (Hawick), I. A. M. Paxton (Selkirk), J. Jeffrey (Kelso), J. R. Beattie (Glasgow Academicals), F. Calder (Stewart's Melville). Replacement: G. M. McGuinness for D. Sole (74 minutes)

Reds: P. W. Dods (Gala), S. W. McAslan (Heriots), Euan Kennedy (Watsonians), A. V. Tait (Kelso), T. Patterson-Brown (London Scottish), A. B. M. Ker (Kelso), G. H. Oliver (Hawick), A. K. Brewster (Stewart's Melville), G. J. Callander (Kelso) [captain], T. G. Waite (Kelso), H. M. Parker (Kilmarnock), A. J. Tomes (Hawick), Jim Calder (Stewart's Melville), D. B. White (Gala), D. J. Turnbull (Hawick). Replacement: N. A. Rowan (Boroughmujir) for Waite (48 minutes)

English matches

Edinburgh District: 

Kent: 

Glasgow District: 

Kent: 

South of Scotland: 

Durham County:

Irish matches

South of Scotland: 

Durham County:

American matches

North and Midlands: 

Eastern:

International matches

South of Scotland District: 

Japan: 

North and Midlands: 

Japan: 

Edinburgh District: 

Japan:

References

1986–87 in Scottish rugby union
1986-87
1986–87 in European rugby union leagues